Kingsmead Stadium was a greyhound racing and motorcycle speedway track and Association football ground in Canterbury. It was host to Canterbury City F.C. and the Canterbury Crusaders speedway team.

The stadium closed in 1999 and was demolished, making way for a residential development.

Origins
The stadium was built on top of a rubbish dump site sandwiched between the Great Stour which flowed to the north and south of the stadium. Access was on the west side of the Kingsmead Road. It opened for football on 30 August 1958 and was also used by Canterbury City F.C., it also doubled up as an athletics track.

Speedway
On 18 May 1968 the speedway track opened for business with the Canterbury Crusaders taking on the Belle Vue Colts.
In 1977, the speedway promoters Johnnie Hoskins and Wally Mawdsley had to go to court in order to keep the track open after complaints of noise from local residents. However, the team was forced to disband on 31 October 1987 when the Canterbury Council refused to renew the lease.

Greyhound racing

The introduction of greyhound racing was problematic as the track encountered issues over the track surface. A wider 398 metres circumference oval was quickly constructed to replace the original track dimensions. The speedway had ended on 31 October 1987 and the greyhounds started just two months earlier on 28 August. The General Manager was Wally Mawdsley (also one of the speedway promoters) and the Racing Manager was Frank Baldwin (soon to be replaced by David Day) when racing began and later Steve Hibbard.

The stadium applied and gained a National Greyhound Racing Club licence under the permit scheme. There were kennels for 82 greyhounds and the public facilities included three bars, a refreshment room and a 150 seated restaurant.

The track experienced unprecedented success for a small track after recruiting Irishman John McGee Sr., McGee also known as Ginger McGee had worked for Fred Wiseman before taking out a trainer's licence and joining Canterbury. The McGee trained Hit the Lid won the 1988 English Greyhound Derby for the stadium.

The track secured a lucrative Bookmakers Afternoon Greyhound Service (BAGS) contract and Hit The Lid was announced the 1988 Greyhound of the year and McGee claimed two consecutive Trainer of the year titles in 1988 & 1989. The Thames Silver Salver previously run at Southend Stadium was introduced by Canterbury as the main competition in 1988 and it
was to take place in the summer renamed just the Silver Salver.

Trainer Patsy Byrne joined the track and trained Juvenile champion Druids Johno; the black dog was half owned by H.R.H. Prince Edward. The half share had been given to the Prince by Byrne during a charity meeting at Canterbury, all prize money would go to the Royal Marines Benevolent Fund. It was the same year that black dog was the beaten favourite in the 1990 English Greyhound Derby Final.

In 1992 that Canterbury played host to a new TV channel called Sportscast and Glengar Ranger reached the 1992 English Greyhound Derby final to put the seal on another progressive year.

Closure
In 1995 the track was refused a betting licence, forcing trainers to march on council offices in protest. A reprieve arrived, but clearly there were problems with the local council. A year later plans were rejected for a redevelopment proposal for houses and a hotel, but it was known that further plans would be submitted.

In October 1997 a development brief was approved and in 1998 it was revised to include 140 residential units. On 30 October 1999 racing came to an end at Kingsmead Stadium. The site was soon be demolished, and today it is where Ambleside Place and Westwood Drive is situated.

Track records

References

Defunct greyhound racing venues in the United Kingdom
Sports venues in Kent
Sport in Canterbury
Buildings and structures in Canterbury
Defunct speedway venues in England